Katherine Hancock Goode (1872–1928) was a teacher, teacher educator, administrator, and state legislator in Illinois. John Paul Goode (1852–1932), a professor of Geography at the University of Chicago, was her husband. The Minnesota Historical Society has a photo of her and her husband.

She was born in Kellogg, Minnesota. She and Flora Sylvester Cheney were politically active. A park bench commemorates them. Cheney campaigned for Charles E. Merriam.

Goode campaigned for civil rights including voting rights for women. She also advocated for an eight-hour workday, women on juries, and better conditions for incarcerated women.

References

1872 births
1928 deaths
People from Wabasha County, Minnesota
American suffragists
20th-century American women politicians
20th-century American politicians
Women state legislators in Illinois
Members of the Illinois House of Representatives
20th-century American educators
20th-century American women educators
Schoolteachers from Illinois
American school administrators